Racing Project Bandoh Ltd. is a Japanese racing team competing in the Super GT series.

Racing history 

Created in 1990 by Masaaki Bando, Racing Project Bandoh raced in the All Japan Touring Car Championship from 1987 (as an earlier organization created by Bando until 1990) to 1997 and entered the Japanese Grand Touring Championship in 1997, competing with a Nissan Silvia S14 in the GT300 class winning five consecutive podiums. In the team's first year of competition, drivers Hideo Fukuyama and Manabu Orido won the GT300 class championship. The next year Bandoh switched to a Toyota Celica, but could not recreate the success of the previous year, taking no podiums with driver Manabu Orido placing second in the drivers' championship. Racing Project Bandoh won the first race of the season at the Suzuka GT 300, and ended the season with drivers Takahiko Hara and Manabu Orido taking third in the drivers championship. Three points behind the winner, Morio Nitta. Bandoh would win one race in 2000 at Sportsland SUGO, and one race in 2001 at Twin Ring Motegi.

2003 brought more success for the team after changing to a new Toyota Celica mid-way through the season, taking wins at Mt. Fuji and Suzuka and drivers Takayuki Aoki and Minoru Tanaka finishing fourth in the championship. Bandoh won one race at Sportsland SUGO in 2004.

It was not until 2007 that Racing Project Bandoh would achieve victory again, winning the fifth round of the season at Sportsland SUGO. In 2008 the team won the seventh round of the season at Motegi. The same year Masaaki Bando's son Masataka Bando took over operations of the team after Masaaki Bando was appointed as the chairman of the Super GT series. The following year in 2009 drivers Manabu Orido and Tatsuya Kataoka in a Lexus IS350 took five podiums including one win. As a result, Racing Project Bandoh won both the team and drivers championship by 3 points over Nobuteru Taniguchi and Ryo Orime in the GT300 class.

In 2011 Racing Project Bandoh moved to the GT500 class competing in a Lexus SC430 under the name LEXUS TEAM WedsSport BANDOH.

In 2015 and 2016 the team fielded both a Lexus RC F in the GT500 class and a Toyota 86 in the GT300 class in conjunction with UP GARAGE.

Racing Project Bandoh has long been associated with the team's main sponsor WedsSport, a Japanese aftermarket wheel manufacturer.

Results

References 

Japanese auto racing teams
Super GT teams
Toyota in motorsport
Auto racing teams established in 1990